José Ramón Araneda y Araneda (born 14 September 1887) was a Chilean politician and the 11th Mayor of the commune of Pichilemu, an office which he held between July 1928 and July 1930.

Political career
He was appointed mayor of the junta de vecinos (neighbors' council) of Pichilemu by decree of President Carlos Ibáñez del Campo following José Camilo Silva's departure, on 10 July 1928. His term lasted until 12 July 1930.

References

1887 births
Year of death missing
Mayors of Pichilemu
People from Arauco Province